Sven Hulterström (born 14 May 1938) is a Swedish social democrat politician who held several political and government posts, including minister of communications (Transport) and minister of health and social affairs. In addition, he was a long-term member of the Riksdag.

Biography
Hulterström was born on 14 May 1938. He was a member of the Swedish Social Democratic Party. He worked at the Gothenburg City Council in the period 1971–1985 and served as the chairman of the municipal board for two terms, in the periods 1976–1979 and 1982–1985. During his term Hulterström was one of the leading figures in the regionalisation process and was instrumental in the establishment of the county of Västra Götaland.

Hulterström was the minister of communications (Transport) in the period 1985–1989 and minister of health and social affairs between 1989 and 1990. The cabinets were led by first Olof Palme and then by Ingvar Carlsson.

Hulterström was elected to the Riksdag in 1985 and served there until 2002. He held several posts at the Riksdag, including the chairman of the general assembly from 1998 to 2002. In 2003 he was named as the chairman of Stokab, an infrastructure company owned by the Stockholm Municipality.

In November 2019 a book entitled Sven Hulterström – Ett liv i politikens centrum was published by the author Mats Wångersjö.

References

External links

1938 births
Living people
Members of the Riksdag from the Social Democrats
Swedish Ministers for Communications
Swedish Ministers for Social Affairs
Members of the Riksdag 1985–1988
Members of the Riksdag 1988–1991
Members of the Riksdag 1991–1994
Members of the Riksdag 1994–1998
Members of the Riksdag 1998–2002